Pouilly-sur-Serre (literally Pouilly on Serre) is a commune in the Aisne department in Hauts-de-France in northern France with approximately 530 inhabitants. Pouilly-sur-Serre is 3 km southwest of Crécy-sur-Serre and 13 km north of Laon. The river Serre forms the northern border of the commune. Pouilly is in the middle of a huge agricultural plain, where the fields are typically used for growing vegetables and grains.

History
The village was given to Saint Remi, the Bishop of Reims (b. 437) by
Clovis I, the Frankish king from 481 to 511. Saint Remi himself made the contribution of the Laon church. In 1568, the village was pillaged and sacked by Calvinists. Pouilly was the location of a leprosy facility that was part of a Laon religious order. In 1883, Pouilly took the name "Pouilly-sur-Serre".

Economy

In Pouilly chicory, grains, beets, and potatoes are cultivated. The William Saurin company employs 343 people. About 75,000 tonnes of Italian, exotic, and quenelles dishes are made each year, under the trademarks "Garbit", "Petitjean" and "Panzani".

Population

See also
Communes of the Aisne department

References

Communes of Aisne
Aisne communes articles needing translation from French Wikipedia